The 1st Commando Regiment (1 Cdo Regt) is an Australian Army Reserve special forces unit, part of Special Operations Command with an integrated structure of regular (full-time) soldiers and reserve (part-time) soldiers, which together with the full-time Australian Army 2nd Commando Regiment, provides the commando capability to Special Operations Command. Raised in 1955 it is the oldest unit within Special Operations Command and in 2008 deployed to Afghanistan to become the first Australian Army Reserve force element on combat operations since World War II.

Role
The primary role of 1st Commando Regiment is to provide a scalable and deployable mission command headquarters to Special Operations Command (SOCOMD). In addition, the regiment is manned, trained and equipped to provide commando force elements up to a company size, as well as providing high quality, competent individual commandos to round out, reinforce and rotate with other SOCOMD capabilities.

During the period from the early 2000s to the early 2010s, combat operations and the evolution of the commando role changed the character of the regiment. The regiment revised reserve training following combat operations, to align training standards with the full-time 2nd Commando Regiment (2 Cdo Regt), and to provide a higher level of readiness for the regiment, however, this affected recruitment due to the long full-time commitment and is now optional.

History

Origins
 
Derived from the South African/Dutch word used by the Boers identifying their irregular sized raiding forces employed against the British during the South African Wars, the term "commando" was adopted by newly formed British raiding forces during World War II, and subsequently used by Australian special units raised to fight in the South-west Pacific and Indian Oceans. By the close of World War II, Australian special forces units included the Independent Companies (later Commando Squadrons), Z Special Unit under Special Operations Australia and M Special Unit under Allied Intelligence Bureau.

By the early 1950s, it was deemed necessary by the Army to maintain the techniques and skills that had been developed during the war. Consequently, on 16 September 1954, the Military Board issued the authority to raise two Citizen Military Force (CMF) commando companies: the 1 Commando Company (1 Cdo Coy) in Sydney and the 2 Commando Company (2 Cdo Coy) in Melbourne. Both would be commanded by regular army officers and regular army would form the training and administrative cadre. The companies were to be independent of each other and report to different commands.

The established strength for the companies was to be 265 all ranks, consisting of one major, five captains (three of them platoon commanders), six sergeants and 241 other ranks. This establishment was very similar to the Independent Companies of World War II, which had had an establishment of 17 officers and 256 other ranks.

1 Cdo Coy was raised in New South Wales on 24 February 1955; however, the officer commanding, Major William Harold (Mac) Grant decided that the official birthday would be their first parade on 15 July 1955 at Victoria Barracks. Major Grant was a World War II commando veteran having served in the 2/5 Independent Company and 2/12th Commando Squadron. 2 Cdo Coy was raised in Victoria on 24 February 1955 under the command of Major Peter Seddon and first paraded on 7 July 1955. Seddon was appointed for only 12 months with his successor to be Major Jack Anderson.

In October 1955, Grant and Anderson, along with two Warrant Officers Ernie Tarr and Ron Smith, travelled to the United Kingdom to train with the Royal Marines (RM). At the same time, two RM sergeants Mac McDermott and Len Holmes, both Special Boat Service (SBS) trained, travelled to Australia to provide commando training with Holmes based with 1 Cdo Coy and McDermott with 2 Cdo Coy. Anderson was killed during the last week of the basic commando course and was replaced by Major John Hutcheson.  In May 1956, Grant and Hutcheson returned to Australia after six months of training having been awarded the green beret by 42 Commando. Tarr and Smith undertook 12 months of training, including with the Cliff Assault Wing and the SBS, to become training instructors.

Grant has said that the defence planning staff convinced the government to form the commando companies with the role "...of conducting clandestine operations similar to those mounted by special operations also those of the Independent Companies/Commando Squadrons. It was envisaged that by raising units capable of performing such a dual role, a pool of trained manpower would be available to be "farmed off" as necessary to a special operations unit while the remainder would be used in more conventional commando operations." The Australian Secret Intelligence Service had earlier been formed in 1952 within the Department of Defence whose role included ".. plan for and conduct special operations..".

Commando courses included basic parachutist, diving, small scale raids, demolitions, climbing and roping and unarmed combat. 1 Cdo Coy held the first diving course in 1957 using a pure oxygen re-breather the Swimmer Canoeist Breathing Apparatus borrowed from the Navy based on training received from the SBS.

In 1957, as the unit already had the designation "1st" within its title, the Army thought it would be a convenient framework on which to re-form the Australian Imperial Force's 1st Battalion. So on 1 December 1957 the unit was re-designated the 1st Infantry Battalion (Commando), keeping this title until 22 August 1966 when the unit was renamed the 1st Battalion, The Royal New South Wales Regiment (Commando), City of Sydney's Own Regiment. Finally in May 1973 the unit name at last changed back to the former designation of the 1 Commando Company. In 1958, the 1st Commando Company provided the initial training for the recently formed 1st Special Air Service Company, the Royal Australian Regiment.

On the evening of 17 February 1960, 74 commandos from 2 Cdo Coy set off in kayaks, amphibious DUKW (ducks) and zodiacs on a training exercise from Point Lonsdale to Point Nepean in Victoria simulating a raid on the officer cadet school which involved them crossing the infamous Rip at the entrance to Port Phillip Bay. The weather changed without warning and the watercraft were swept out to sea through the Port Phillip Heads encountering massive seas that capsized most watercraft. Nearly all commandos were rescued except three who drowned. 2nd Commando Company developed a Mountain Leader's Course in ski patrolling, as well as rock, ice and snow climbing.

In 1968, 2 Cdo Coy moved to Fort Gellibrand at Williamstown from Ripponlea. The company had originally been based at Sandringham then sometime between 1957-58 moved to HMAS Cerberus before moving to Ripponlea in 1958.

301st and 126th Signal Squadrons
The requirement for long-range communications can be traced back to WWII and units such as Coastwatchers, New Guinea Air Warning Wireless Company, the Independent Companies, and Z Special Unit. On 30 April 1958, a decision was made to raise No 1 Independent Signals Squadron to support clandestine operations and this led to the formation of 301st Signal Squadron (Home Defence) in 1960 at Lidcombe, New South Wales. This new squadron was to meet the requirement for 'special communications' and was charged with the responsibility of providing long-range communications for commando-type operations and was augmented with regular army members in 1963. In December 1964, 301st Signal Squadron was re-designated 126th Signal Squadron, later to 126th Signal Squadron (Special Forces) in January 1966 and subsequently relocated to Albert Park, Victoria and in 1972 to Simpson Barracks in Watsonia, Victoria. Women had being serving in the signals squadron since 1964 as cipher clerks and from 1968 as radio operators. In 1978, the signals squadron was provided with approval to wear the green beret with the Corps of Signals badge. In 1981, signaller Kerry Hiam became the first woman to qualify and be awarded a green beret.

Borneo and Vietnam
Prior to formation as a Regiment, the sub units deployed individuals and small teams to the Borneo confrontation and the Vietnam War. During the Borneo confrontation, Sergeant Ted Blacker of 126th Signal Squadron (Special Forces) was awarded the British Empire Medal. From 1965 the Commando Companies contributed numerous instructors, including from their reserve part-time component, to the Australian Army Training Team Vietnam (AATTV). Two lost their lives with the AATTV, with Warrant Officer Class II John Durrington being killed in action, and Warrant Officer Class II Ron Scott dying of wounds. Whilst serving with the AATTV, Warrant Officer Class II Ray Simpson, formerly from both the Special Air Service Regiment and the 1st Commando Company, was awarded the Victoria Cross for an action in the Kontum Province on 6 May 1969.

Formation of Regimental Headquarters
All sub-units operated independently, training Army Reserve commandos and Special Forces signalers until 1981 when it was determined a regimental headquarters was required. This headquarters would coordinate the efforts of the previously independent units and provide the east coast command element for the newly established counter-terrorist capability within the Special Air Service Regiment. The headquarters was established on 1 February 1981 and from 1 July 1981 was based at Randwick Barracks in Randwick, New South Wales.

In 1991, a 1st Commando Company commando who had joined the UK Special Air Service was in the well-known Bravo Two Zero patrol in Iraq as part of Operation Desert Storm. In 1992, 126th Signal Squadron (Special Forces) qualified commandos were given approval to wear the commando badge.

Commencing in February 1997, 1 Cdo Regt provided the initial training for the re-role of the 4th Battalion, Royal Australian Regiment (4RAR) from an infantry battalion into commando 4RAR (Cdo) raising the Commando Training Wing (the predecessor to the Special Forces Training Centre) commanded by Major Hans Fleer. The 126th Signal Squadron (Special Forces) was incorporated into 4RAR(Cdo) and relocated to Holsworthy. In 1998, the Army dropped plans to raise a third reserve company in Queensland for the Regiment due to a lack of resources.

In July 1997, three women officers became the first women to complete the commando officer selection course, including Lieutenants Froggatt and Woods. The women were barred from serving in combat roles.

In June 2002, 301st Signal Squadron was re-raised at Randwick Barracks to provide communications and information systems and electronic warfare to facilitate the command and control of special operations conducted by the Regiment. In 2006, 1st Commando Company relocated from Georges Heights in Mosman to HMAS Penguin in Balmoral.

Recent operations

In recent years, the Regiment has frequently deployed on operations, providing small detachments and individuals to peacekeeping missions in the region and deployed operationally in up to company sized combat elements to Afghanistan.

Deployments in the region, include Bougainville as unarmed monitors as part of Operation BEL ISI, Timor Leste (East Timor) as peacekeepers in 2001 as part of UNTAET providing a substantial reinforcement to 4RAR(Cdo) and Solomon Islands in 2003 as part of RAMSI providing peacekeeping teams to support operations.

In May 2006, SOCOMD deployed to Timor Leste as peacekeepers in Operation Astute with a Special Operations Task Group to conduct special recovery and evacuation operations.  Post the extraction of the initial Task Group, the special operations component in Timor Leste was reduced – often commanded by a member of the 1 Cdo Regt and the force element supplemented by 1 Cdo Regt teams.

In March 2007, the Task Group was bolstered to form an Apprehension Task Force with the purpose of apprehending ex-Timorese Army Major and rebel leader, Alfredo Reinado, at the request of the President of Timor Leste. Reinado was eventually located in the village of Same.  Following negotiations between the Timor Leste government and the rebels, the decision was made to detain Reinado by force.  Reinado evaded capture but five of his men were killed in the battle. For the members of the 1 Cdo Regt who participated in this Special Operations Task Group mission the battle was the first combat seen by the unit (at greater than individual level).

In 2008, the Regiment's operational commitment took a step further with the deployment of an entire Commando Company Group to the Special Operations Task Group (SOTG) in Afghanistan as part of Operation Slipper.  This constituted the first deployment of an Army Reserve force element on combat operations since World War II and the Regiment continued to support this operational commitment with similar deployments the following year. The role of the commando company in Afghanistan was to conduct offensive operations deep within enemy safe havens to provide security to both coalition forces and the people of Afghanistan. This was achieved through intelligence-led direct action missions to disrupt and destroy enemy forces within known insurgent strong holds known as "kill or capture" missions.

The first deployment was composed of 1 Cdo Coy personnel supplemented by 2 Cdo Coy personnel. It was commanded by the Major OC 1 Cdo Coy and arrived in November 2008 for a four-month tour of duty until February 2009. On 27 November 2008, Lieutenant Michael Fussell, a specialist Joint Terminal Attack Controller (JTAC) from 4RAR Cdo serving in the Commando Company Group, was killed in action after he stood on an IED during a night infiltration onto a target. Following Fussell's death several senior personnel asked to be relieved of their positions due to concerns over the Major and after an inquiry into the death, the Major was relieved of his command and returned to Australia. The inquiry raised issues into the Commando Company Group outside the scope of its terms that instigated the appointment of Vice Admiral (retired) Chris Ritchie to conduct a further inquiry that found that the Group had been inadequately trained and prepared for its deployment, and that concerns over the Major's leadership should have been acted on before the Group deployed.

On 4 January 2009, the Regiment suffered its first combat fatality when Private Gregory Sher (2 Cdo Coy) was killed by a rocket attack into a patrol base. On 12 February 2009, the Group conducted a night compound clearance in the Sorkh Morghab region with elements of the Afghan National Army and with Afghan interpreters. Corporal W saw, through a window, a male holding an AK-47 rifle pointed at a door that his team was preparing to use to enter the room to clear and fired at him through the window with his rifle. The male returned fire and ignored calls made for him to come out. With fire continuing, and the team being unable to retreat, two grenades were thrown by Lance Corporal M to clear the room. The room was entered, whereupon soldiers found women and children present, with five fatalities (three children and two babies) having been inflicted, along with the male, Amrullah Khan, a farmer whose family claimed had no affiliation with the Taliban. The Australian Director of Military Prosecutions, Brigadier Lyn McDade, decided to charge two members of the Regiment, Sergeant J, who gave the order to use grenades, and Lance Corporal M, who threw the grenades, with manslaughter as a result of an investigation into the engagement, coming to the view that they ought to have known, and during the attack then certainly have been aware that women and children were in the room. The charges against the two soldiers were dismissed pre-trial by the Judge Advocate in June 2011. Charges against Lieutenant Colonel M, who based in Kandahar ordered the clearance of the compound, were withdrawn in August 2011 for disobeying standard operating procedures to prevent innocent Afghan nationals in their homes being wrongfully targeted.

The Regiment served in SOTG Rotations:- Eight, Nine, Eleven, Fourteen, Eighteen and Twenty. A Rotation ranged from about four to six, seven, and eight months. The Regiment was the sole SOCOMD combat unit in Rotation Eleven with no elements from the SASR or 2 Cdo Regt and were assigned Population Centric Operations.

Customs and traditions
The Sherwood Green Commando beret is worn as the primary form of head dress, formally recognising Commando qualification. The Army sought permission from the Royal Marines to wear the green beret which was provided on 27 July 1955 by the Commandant Royal Marines. The first green beret awarded in Australia was presented to Captain George Cardy of 1st Commando Company on 14 July 1956.

The Director of Infantry advised that the Infantry Corps badge should not be worn and that the commandos should have their own badge. A regimental badge was created featuring a silver World War II-era fighting knife surmounted by a gold boomerang engraved with the regimental motto "Strike Swiftly". The motto was conceived by Major Mac Grant, the first commander of 1st Commando Company, from reading the book "Swiftly They Struck" and agreed to by Major Peter Seddon, his opposite number in the 2nd Commando Company. The badge was a combination of two proposals from a competition, one from Melbourne and one from Sydney, conceived by Grant with agreement from Seddon. Members wear a Garter Blue lanyard on the left shoulder of dress uniforms in common with the other combat units of SOCOMD. In 1991, distinctive black and green commando parachute wings were adopted and are now worn by all parachute qualified commandos.

While there is no direct lineage to the 1st Battalion, AIF, other than in the 1st Commando Company's renaming to the 1st Battalion (Commando), the regiment retains the colours of the battalion's World War I colour patch – black over green – which are highlighted on the current 1 Cdo Regt flag.

Organisation
The Regiment consists of a headquarters, two commando companies and a signals squadron with a strength about 450. It is organised as follows:
 Regimental Headquarters located at Randwick Barracks in Randwick, New South Wales
 1 Commando Company (1 Cdo Coy) located at HMAS Penguin in Balmoral, New South Wales
 2 Commando Company (2 Cdo Coy) located in the historic Fort Gellibrand at Williamstown, Victoria 
 301 Signal Squadron (301 Sig Sqn) headquarters at Randwick Barracks and elements of the squadron are located with 1 Cdo Coy, 2 Cdo Coy, Canberra and the Special Operations Engineer Regiment

Each commando company has six platoons, including a headquarters platoon, three commando platoons, a reconnaissance platoon and a training platoon together with a signals troop and integral combat service support. Combat elements of the Regiment typically operate in platoon to company sized force elements.  These will be force tailored by requirement and may not fit any doctrinal size or command and control. The signal squadron has the largest full-time contingent in the Regiment.

Reserve support roles include clerical, logistics, transport, medical, intelligence, linguistics and information systems.

Equipment
1 Cdo Regt is equipped with a range of weapon systems that allows it to tailor requirements based on mission needs. These include the M4A1 5.56mm carbine and Heckler & Koch USP 9mm pistol as primary weapons. Specialist weapons include the Heckler & Koch HK417 7.62mm rifle, Heckler & Koch MP5SD silenced submachine gun, Accuracy International SR98 7.62mm sniper rifle and Barrett M82 12.7mm anti-materiel rifle. Support weapons include the Para Minimi 5.56mm light machine gun, Maximi 7.62mm machine gun, MAG 58 7.62mm medium machine gun, M2HB QCB 12.7mm heavy machine gun, M3 Carl Gustav anti-tank rifle, Mk 19 automatic grenade launcher, Javelin anti-tank weapon and mortars.

The primary commando watercraft is the Zodiac F470 inflatable boat with the specialist folding kayaks available. Vehicles used include the Land Rover Surveillance Reconnaissance Vehicle 4x4 and Polaris 4x4 and 6x6 all-terrain vehicles. Various static line and free-fall parachutes are available including the T10/T11/MC1/MC5.

Recruitment

The regiment is the only reserve SOCOMD combat unit providing Reservists based in the Eastern states of Australia the opportunity to serve in a commando unit. Additionally, the regiment provides discharging Regular Army SOCOMD soldiers the opportunity to continue to serve in SOCOMD in a reserve capacity on their return to civilian life. Before the raising of 2 Cdo Regt, the regiment's Regular Army cadre consisted of soldiers transferred from the SASR.

Changes introduced to reserve training after combat operations in Afghanistan, required candidates to complete the 332-day continuous full-time Commando Initial Employment Training course the same as their 2 Cdo Regt Regular Army counterparts. However, this provided reserve candidates with the opportunity to consider service in the Regular Army with 2 Cdo Regt with many candidates destined for the regiment instead choosing 2 Cdo Regt. Also, the long full-time commitment discouraged Reservists from considering joining the regiment.

In 2015, the regiment begun its biggest reserve recruitment drive in over 10 years. A training regime similar to the one prior to Afghanistan operations, was introduced with candidates after completing the selection course posted to the regiment and given a three-year term to complete training.

The regiment is also re-raising training platoons in each of the commando companies to host Army Reserve aspirants training for selection who will parade under their current corps and trade to complete the Special Forces Reserve Training Program over 12 months (based on the 12-week full-time Accelerated Infantry Training Course). The Program also includes the 17-week Commando Physical Training Package.

In addition, in 2016 direct civilian recruiting is to recommence with prospective commandos undergoing Reserve Recruit Training Course at Kapooka and Infantry Initial Employment Training at Singleton before parading at the regiment as a qualified Infantry rifleman in the training platoon the same as serving Reservists.

Selection and training

Prior to selection, 1 Cdo Regt reserve candidates have over 12 months to complete the Special Forces Reserve Training Program, based on the 2 Cdo Regt Special Forces Direct Recruitment 13-week Special Forces Accelerated Infantry Training Program, including the Commando Fitness Training Package. The first stage of selection is to successfully pass the one-day Special Forces Entry Test at the Special Forces Training Centre. The second stage of selection is successfully completing the full-time Commando Selection Course conducted over two weeks. In contrast, 2 Cdo Regt candidates are required to complete the Commando Selection and Training Course over a six-week period.

Commando Initial Employment training (also called the "reinforcement cycle") commences after successful completion of the Commando Selection Course with candidates having three years to successfully complete the course. This cycle consists of numerous courses including: the Special Forces Weapons Course, Advanced Close Quarter Battle Course, Commando Team Tactics Course, Commando Urban Operations Course, Close Quarter Fighting Course, Commando Demolitions and Breaching Course, Special Forces Basic Parachute Course (including water insertion training), Commando Amphibious Operators Course, Special Forces Military Roping Course, and Combat First Aid or Special Forces Signal Course. Candidates have the option of completing the reinforcement cycle over 11 months full-time training with their 2 Cdo Regt counterparts.

After the successful completion of Commando Initial Employment Training, the Green beret is awarded and reservists will report to the regiment on a frequent basis to maintain their skills. As a qualified Commando there are specialist courses available to complete, including but not limited to: advanced driving, mortars, cold weather / mountaineering, language training and free fall parachuting.

In 2013, a four-hour documentary Commando, focusing mainly on the 2 Cdo Regt, was produced detailing the Commando selection and reinforcement training processes.

New signallers to 301st Signal Squadron have to complete the Special Forces Signaller Course (SFSC).

Notes

Footnotes

Citations

References

Further reading

External links
Commando Welfare Trust
Australian Commando Association Victoria
Commando News Magazine

Regiments of Australia
Special forces of Australia
Airborne units and formations of Australia
Military units and formations established in 1981